Podanotum is a Neotropical genus of butterfly in the family Lycaenidae.All the species except Podanotum salaeides (Draudt, 1919) are recently described.

References

Eumaeini
Lycaenidae of South America
Lycaenidae genera